Callichroma batesi is a species of beetle in the family Cerambycidae. It was described by Gahan in 1894. It is known from Costa Rica and Nicaragua.

References

Callichromatini
Beetles described in 1894
Taxa named by Charles Joseph Gahan